Hannibal Hamlin is a bronze sculpture depicting the American attorney and politician of the same name by Charles Tefft, installed at the United States Capitol's National Statuary Hall, in Washington, D.C., as part of the National Statuary Hall Collection. The statue was gifted by the U.S. state of Maine in 1935.

See also
 1935 in art

References

External links

 

1935 establishments in Washington, D.C.
1935 sculptures
Bronze sculptures in Washington, D.C.
Governor of Maine
Monuments and memorials in Washington, D.C.
Hamlin, Hannibal
Sculptures of men in Washington, D.C.